Nemuaron vieillardii is a species of trees in the Atherospermataceae family. It is endemic to New Caledonia and the only species of the genus Nemuaron. Its closest relative is the monotypic genus Atherosperma from Australia.

References

Endemic flora of New Caledonia
Monotypic Laurales genera
Atherospermataceae
Taxa named by Henri Ernest Baillon